The second season of The Great Australian Bake Off premiered on 13 October 2015. The series saw twelve home bakers take part in a bake-off to test their baking skills as they battle to be crowned The Great Australian Bake Off's best amateur baker. Unlike the first season, season two aired on pay television channel LifeStyle Food and was produced by FremantleMedia Australia. The season is hosted by Claire Hooper and Mel Buttle and is judged by Maggie Beer and Matt Moran. The season consisted of 10 episodes.

In a slight change to the first season and the British edition of the show, this season took place in the Bake-Off Shed as opposed to a tent or marquee.

The Bakers
The following is a list of contestants:
{| class="wikitable" style="text-align:center"
|-
! style="background:skyblue" "color:black;"| Baker
! style="background:skyblue" "color:black;"| Age 
! style="background:skyblue" "color:black;"| Occupation 
! style="background:skyblue" "color:black;"| Hometown
! style="background:skyblue" "color:black;"| Competition Status
|-
| Sian Redgrave || 23 || Fashion boutique stylist || Perth, Western Australia || style="background:gold"| Season Winner
|-
| Jasmin Hartley || 27 || Barista || Mackay, Queensland || style="background:limegreen"| Season Runner-Up
|-
| Suzy Stefanidis || 45 || Stay at home mum || Melbourne, Victoria || style="background:limegreen"| Season Runner-Up
|-
| Angela Fleay || 47 || Truck driver || Melbourne, Victoria || style="background:tomato"| Eliminated (Episode 9)
|-
| James Dunsmore || 31 || Food historian || Sydney, New South Wales || style="background:tomato"| Eliminated (Episode 8)
|-
| Nathan Taylor || 19 || Student || Perth, WA || style="background:tomato"| Eliminated (Episode 7)
|-
| Benjamin "Ben" Brown || 37 || Mining inventory planner || Emerald, Queensland || style="background:tomato"| Eliminated (Episode 6)
|-
| Brendan Eilola || 43 || IT specialist || Brisbane, Queensland || style="background:tomato"| Eliminated (Episode 5)
|-
| Janice Tan || 34 || Management consultant || Sydney, New South Wales || style="background:tomato"| Eliminated (Episode 4)
|-
| Meghan "Meg" Moorcroft || 20 || Student || Adelaide, South Australia || style="background:tomato"| Eliminated (Episode 3)
|-
| Mariana Gates || 55 || Volunteer worker || Gold Coast, Queensland || style="background:tomato"| Eliminated (Episode 2)
|-
| Dr. Peter "Pete" Rankin || 58 || Doctor || Melbourne, Victoria || style="background:tomato"| Eliminated (Episode 1)
|}

Results summary

Colour key:

Episodes

Episode 1: Cakes
For the bakers' first challenge, a family-sized signature cake was set. This was set to be done in two hours, and should show the baker's style. For the technical challenge, Maggie's recipe for her constitution cake. It combined indigenous Australian fruits and icing to make three cakes. It was to be done in two and a half hours. A hidden design cake was set as the showstopper challenge. In five hours, the bakers must create a cake that shows a pattern or design once cut into.

Episode 2: Biscuits

Episode 3: Choux

Episode 4: Pies

Episode 5: Chocolate

Episode 6: Bread

Episode 7: Dessert

Episode 8: Pastry

Episode 9: Classics

Episode 10: Final

Ratings

References

2015 Australian television seasons
2